Sally-Anne Frances Jones (17 November 1968 –  June 2017) was a British terrorist, Islamist, and UN-designated recruiter and propagandist for the Islamic State of Iraq and the Levant (ISIL), known variously as Umm Hussain al-Britani, Sakinah Hussein, and the White Widow.  She is thought to have been killed in June 2017 by a US drone strike, but sources are unable to confirm.

Early life
Jones was born in Greenwich, south-east London. An only child, her parents divorced when she was a child; her father took his own life shortly after, when Jones was 10 years old. Brought up as a Catholic, she participated in Christian youth groups while a teenager, leaving school at 16 and entering employment working for L’Oréal selling cosmetics. A former punk rock guitarist and singer active during the 1990s in an all-female band called Krunch, Jones is reported to have been living on welfare benefits (which she denied) in a council house in Chatham, Kent and to have used a food bank before her departure for Syria.  Spending much time on the Internet, she became interested in witchcraft and alternative lifestyles.

ISIS
Jones converted to Islam and left her previous partner claiming, in social media exchanges with Sunday Times journalist Dipesh Gadher, that the Iraq War had converted her (around May 2013) to the ISIS cause. Together with Junaid Hussain, who was in charge of recruiting hackers to ISIS, she recruited and propagandised for ISIS. Jones travelled to Syria with her younger son in late 2013 to join Hussain, originally from Birmingham, who soon became her husband.

Hussain was killed by a U.S. drone strike on 25 August 2015, After Hussain's death, Jones commented that her husband was killed by "the greatest enemy of Allah". He was "a good role model for my children", Jones told Dipesh Gadher. The following month, Jones was one of four Britons placed on the UN's most-wanted list at the request of the British prime minister David Cameron. It was believed to be the first time any country had placed one of its own nationals on a list of ISIS operatives. Responding on Twitter, Jones said she would continue to fight "England...until my last breath".

Jones's activity online was consistent with her role as leader of the secret Anwar al-Awlaki battalion’s female wing. In this role, Jones was responsible for training all European female recruits, or muhajirat, in the use of weapons and tactics. These muhajirat were then trained and instructed to carry out suicide missions in the West, according to leaked ISIS documents. Despite some reports, according to Kim Sengupta in The Independent, there is no proof of her leading all-female groups of ISIS members into battle.

According to the Counter Extremism Project (CEP), Jones used Twitter to propagandise for ISIS. She is believed to have recruited hundreds of British women to work for ISIS and in 2016 called on female sympathisers in Britain to make terrorist strikes in London, Glasgow, and Wales during Ramadan. American court documents made available in spring 2017 linked Jones and her husband to at least a dozen ISIS plots; many of these either did not take place or were stopped while being put into action. She was involved in publishing three online lists of US military personnel intended as potential targets for jihadists. Jones even specifically targeted the lives of 100 soldiers by posting the personal information of these soldiers online to facilitate locating them. In other tweets, Jones called out specific soldiers by making their names the subject of her tweets. Included in this personal targeting was a Navy Seal who was involved in the killing of Osama Bin Laden. By this time, the American military reportedly considered her a "high priority" for assassination.

Jones’ most meaningful contribution to the terrorist organization is thought to have been the influence she was able to exert on women globally, specifically western women, to join ISIS. She had said she was "leading a battalion of jihadist women".

Probable death and aftermath
In October 2017, the Daily Mirror reported that Jones had been killed in an American drone strike in June 2017 along with her 12-year-old son, JoJo. While the mother and son are presumed to have been killed in Raqqa while escaping the drone strike, this has not been confirmed because DNA evidence was never recovered. The pair were believed to be on their way to ISIS-occupied Mayadin. According to Shiraz Maher, Jones is the first woman to have been directly targeted in an airstrike, and one of only two women considered at the time by the American state department as a foreign terrorist combatant.

Jones had decided to raise her younger son, JoJo, as an ISIS child soldier. Her former partner said in August 2016 that their son had participated in a video in which JoJo, along with four other boys, had shot five Kurdish hostages in the back of the head. Jones issued a statement saying the boy was not JoJo.

Jones and her husband regularly used their son as a human shield to prevent being targeted by drone attacks. The legal case for the killings of JoJo and his mother has been contested because his age means he would be classified as a "non-combatant".

According to guidance from the International Committee of the Red Cross (ICRC), Jones may not be considered a member of ISIS (she would be a legitimate target if she was), because she did not carry out a "continuous combat function". Amnesty International said the killing of Jones and her son was of "questionable legality".

An older son, aged 20, remained in the UK. JoJo's reported death was disputed in November 2017 by Syrian sources. However, in January 2018, Dipesh Gadher of The Sunday Times wrote of an "informed source" who had told him "it's 99.9% certain that they were both killed".

A member of "The Beatles" terrorist group, Alexanda Kotey, said on ITV News in late May 2019 that Jones and her son were killed in a building that was shelled on 25 May 2017, a few days after the Manchester Arena bombing.

See also
 Samantha Lewthwaite

References

Notes

External links
Counter Extremism Project profile

1968 births
2017 deaths
British Islamists
Deaths by United States drone strikes in Syria
Islamic State of Iraq and the Levant members